The FIL World Luge Natural Track Championships 2013 took place 23–27 January in Deutschnofen-Nova Ponente, Italy.

Men's singles

Women's singles

Men's doubles

Mixed team

Medal table

Notes and references

FIL 2012-13 Natural Track World Cup Schedule. 
Official website 

FIL World Luge Natural Track Championships
2013 in Italian sport
2013 in luge
Luge in Italy